Double Eclipse is the debut studio album released by the American hard rock band Hardline in 1992.

The first single released from the album was "Takin' Me Down", written by Johnny and Joey Gioeli with Neal Schon. "Takin' Me Down" peaked at No. 37 on the Billboard Mainstream Rock Tracks chart in June 1992. The album's second single, a cover of a Mainstream Rock Tracks chart hit by Danny Spanos from 1983 and written by members of the band Streetheart, "Hot Cherie" rose to No. 25 on the Mainstream Rock Tracks chart in the fall of 1992.

Journey guitarist Neal Schon joined the Gioeli brothers and toured for this album, which rocks a bit harder than most of his Journey and Bad English tracks had and features little synthesizer (even though it features two tracks co-written with the aforementioned bands' keyboardist, Jonathan Cain), but Schon departed for other projects after the band lost its record deal. Schon was replaced by former The Storm guitarist Josh Ramos.

The song "Can't Find My Way" (in its demo form) is featured during the montage love scene in the 1992 Brandon Lee action movie Rapid Fire. The song "I'll Be There" is played during the film's closing credits.

Hardline's 2002 album, II, and 2012 album, Danger Zone, each depict an eclipse as part of its cover artwork, an homage to Double Eclipse's ten-year and twenty-year anniversaries.

Track listing

Personnel
Band members
 Johnny Gioeli - lead vocals, acoustic guitar, rhythm guitar, percussion
 Neal Schon - lead guitar, rhythm guitar, classical guitar, guitar synthesizer, backing vocals, producer, arrangement
 Joey Gioeli - rhythm guitar, backing vocals
 Todd Jensen - bass, backing vocals
 Deen Castronovo - drums, backing vocals

Production
Tony Phillips - engineer, mixing
John Aguto, Lee Manning, Mike Stock, Randy Wine - assistant engineers
Bob Ludwig - mastering at Masterdisk, New York

References

External links
Heavy Harmonies page

Hardline (band) albums
1992 debut albums
MCA Records albums
Albums recorded at A&M Studios